MI3, the British Military Intelligence Section 3, was a division of the British Directorate of Military Intelligence, part of  the War Office. It was originally set up to handle geographical information. Its subsections in 1914 included:
 MI3a: France, Belgium, Luxembourg, Morocco.
 MI3b: Austria-Hungary and Switzerland.
 MI3c: Germany.
 MI3d: Holland, Norway, Sweden and Denmark.
 MI3e: Military translations.

After World War I, its role was changed to intelligence in Europe, later including the Baltic states, USSR and Scandinavia after Summer 1941. MI3 was headed by Major David Talbot Rice. He recommended the change from supporting the Chetniks to supporting the Partisans in Yugoslavia, see Yugoslavia and the Allies. Its functions were absorbed into MI6 in 1945.

External links
 What happened to MI1 - MI4? MI5 FAQ

Defunct United Kingdom intelligence agencies
1910s establishments in the United Kingdom
Military units and formations disestablished in 1945
Military communications of the United Kingdom
War Office in World War II
British intelligence services of World War II